ANSI/NISO Z39.87 is a standard which defines a set of metadata elements for raster digital images.  The purpose is to help in the development, exchange and interpretation of digital images. The dictionary functions of this standard assist in the interoperability between systems, services, and software.  It is also an aid in the long-term management of and continuing access to digital image collections.

See also
Metadata standards
Metadata Encoding and Transmission Standard (METS)

Bibliography
NISO standard publication: , ANSI Approval Date: 12/18/06

External links
ANSI/NISO Z39.87 - 2006, Data Dictionary - Technical Metadata for Digital Still Images
Library of Congress

Graphics file formats
Metadata standards